Bryan Sellers (born August 19, 1982 in Dayton, Ohio) is an American racing driver. Sellers won the title in the U.S. F2000 in 2002 and later competed in the Atlantic Championship and in racing sports cars.

Racing career
Bryan Sellers first competed in the World Karting Association (WKA) Manufacturer's Cup and the Gold Cup in 1994, racing other young drivers such as Danica Patrick. In 1998, Sellers won the Spec 100 Open class in the Manufacturer's Cup, beating future Atlantic Championship rival Jonathan Macri.

Sellers made his first auto racing start in a Star Mazda in 1998, before competing in the Midwestern Skip Barber Formula Dodge. Sellers won the championship, beating other young hopefuls such as Caio Travaglini and Jason LaPoint. Sellers won his first two races at the Indianapolis Raceway Park road course, and ran races in the other Formula Dodge regions. At Lime Rock Park, Sellers beat Marc Breuers to win two races. In 2000, Sellers competed in the second edition of the Skip Barber National Championship; he won races at Grattan Raceway at the start of the season but lost the title to Canadian Anthony Simone. Due to his strong results in the Skip Barber ranks, Sellers advanced to the Barber Dodge Pro Series at Road America, supporting the Champ Car Grand Prix of Road America, and placed twelfth in his debut race.

For 2001, Sellers signed with DSTP Motorsports for a partial schedule in the U.S. F2000. After one race, the team switched from the Mygale chassis to the more favorable Van Diemen chassis. The best result for Sellers was a seventh place at Sebring International Raceway. Supported by Team USA Scholarship, Sellers and teammate A. J. Allmendinger competed for a number of races in the New Zealand Formula Ford Championship. Sellers and Allmendinger finished second and third in the prestigious New Zealand Grand Prix which was won by Fabian Coulthard. For the 2002 season, Sellers returned to the United States to race in the USF2000, joining the highly successful Cape Motorsports outfit. Sellers won the first race at Sebring and won another seven races to claim the championship. The following year, 2003, Sellers joined the Atlantic Championship with Lynx Racing. Running a partial schedule, Sellers scored three top-ten finishes out of four races. In 2004, Sellers competed in all races of the championship; he claimed three podium finishes: at Long Beach, Cleveland and Denver.

Unable to continue in single seaters, Sellers shifted his focus to the American Le Mans Series and Grand-Am. Panoz Motorsports signed Sellers to drive their Panoz Esperante GTLM. The team had a tough season with a number of retirements. The best result for Sellers was a fifth place at the 2005 Portland Grand Prix with teammate Robin Liddell. For 2006 Sellers joined BMW Team PTG in of their BMW M3 GTR entries. Sellers and teammate Justin Marks finished 24th in the season standings. After running various races in 2007, Sellers joined the Rolex Sports Car Series for their 2008 season. Joining The Racer's Group, Sellers scored a third place in class at the 24 Hours of Daytona. Sellers was placed sixteenth in the series championship. After running three races in 2009 for Team Falken Tire, Sellers joined the team full-time in 2010 and scored numerous top-ten finishes in the American Le Mans Series. In 2011, Sellers scored two class wins in the GT class with teammate Wolf Henzler at Mid-Ohio and Baltimore. For 2012, Sellers remained at Team Falken Tire, run by Walker Racing. Sellers and Henzler again won their class at Baltimore. Sellers also ran in the Continental Tire Sports Car Challenge for Fall-Line Motorsports, placing tenth in the championship standings. In 2013, Sellers won Petit Le Mans in the GT class, the final ALMS event before being merged into the WeatherTech SportsCar Championship. Sellers repeated this performance in 2014. In 2015, Sellers won the 6 Hours of Watkins Glen.

Personal life
Sellers is married to pit lane reporter Jamie Howe, and the couple have two children.

Racing record

American Open-Wheel racing results
(key)

Barber Dodge Pro Series

USF2000 National Championship

Atlantic Championship

Complete WeatherTech SportsCar Championship results
(key) (Races in bold indicate pole position; results in italics indicate fastest lap)

References

External links
 Bryan Sellers Racing 

1982 births
Living people
12 Hours of Sebring drivers
24 Hours of Daytona drivers
24 Hours of Le Mans drivers
American Le Mans Series drivers
Atlantic Championship drivers
Barber Pro Series drivers
Formula Ford drivers
Indy Pro 2000 Championship drivers
Racing drivers from Dayton, Ohio
Rolex Sports Car Series drivers
U.S. F2000 National Championship drivers
WeatherTech SportsCar Championship drivers
World Karting Association drivers
GT World Challenge America drivers
Rahal Letterman Lanigan Racing drivers
Walker Racing drivers
McLaren Racing drivers